The Journal of the American Board of Family Medicine is the official publication of the American Board of Family Medicine. It was formerly published as The Journal of the American Board of Family Practice by the Board of the Massachusetts Medical Society.

Publications established in 1988
Family medicine journals
Bimonthly journals
English-language journals
Academic journals published by learned and professional societies of the United States